The Twenty-eighth Oklahoma Legislature was a meeting of the legislative branch of the government of Oklahoma, composed of the Oklahoma Senate and the Oklahoma House of Representatives. The state legislature met in regular session at the Oklahoma State Capitol in Oklahoma City from January 3 to July 28, 1961, during the term of Governor J. Howard Edmondson.

J. D. McCarty was elected as Speaker of the Oklahoma House of Representatives, breaking the tradition of governor-backed speakers. McCarty would go on to become Oklahoma's first three-term speaker.

Dates of session
January 3 to July 28, 1961
Previous: 27th Legislature • Next: 29th Legislature

Leadership

Democratic leadership
President of the Senate: Lieutenant Governor Cowboy Pink Williams
President Pro Tem of the Senate: Everett Boecher
Speaker of the House: J. D. McCarty
Speaker Pro Tempore: Delbert Inman
Majority Floor Leader: Leland Wolf

Republican leadership
Minority Leader: Carl Etling

Members

Senate

Table based on 2005 Oklahoma Almanac.

House of Representatives

Table based on database of historic members.

Staff
Louise Stockton

References

Oklahoma legislative sessions
1961 in Oklahoma
1962 in Oklahoma
1961 U.S. legislative sessions
1962 U.S. legislative sessions